American Yearbook is a 2004 American drama film written, produced, edited, and directed by Brian Ging. While the film itself is finished, and has been shown at various film festivals, there is currently no public release date.

Plot
Will Nash (Nick Tagas) is the kid-next-door, a typical upbeat high schooler, but his dreams of being a photographer quickly fade, as he is relentlessly terrorized by school bullies Ian (Chris Peter) and Jason (Ryan Nixon). Will adores Amanda (Giovannie Pico), but her best friend Kristy (Jennifer Noble) is dating the head bully Ian. Confused and angry, Will meets a mysterious, brooding character named Chance (Jon Carlo Alvarez), both of them outsiders. Chance eventually convinces Will that they should get a gun and take the bullies out: pull a Columbine. Amanda pleads with Will to set revenge aside, but can Will stop what he and Chance have started, or are Will's emotions too strong for him to just walk away?

Cast
Nick Tagas as William "Will" Nash
Jon Carlo Alvarez as Chance Holden
Chris Peter as Ian Blake
Ryan Nixon as Jason Clarke
Giovannie Pico as Amanda Hunter
Jennifer Noble as Kristy Palmer
Daniel Timko as Brandon Holden

See also

 List of American films of 2004
 Bang Bang You're Dead, a 2002 TV film about a school shooting
 Zero Day, a 2003 film about a school shooting.
 Elephant, another 2003 film about a school shooting.
 Duck! The Carbine High Massacre, a 2000 film about a school shooting.
 The Only Way, another 2004 film about a school shooting.

External links
 

2004 films
2000s English-language films
Films about bullying
Works about the Columbine High School massacre
Films about school violence
2000s teen drama films
American teen drama films
2004 drama films
2000s American films